Frederick McCarthy (15 October 1881 – 15 February 1974) was a Canadian cyclist. He competed in seven events at the 1908 Summer Olympics. He won a bronze medal in the men's team pursuit.

References

External links
 

1881 births
1974 deaths
Canadian male cyclists
Olympic cyclists of Canada
Cyclists at the 1908 Summer Olympics
Olympic bronze medalists for Canada
Olympic medalists in cycling
Sportspeople from Stratford, Ontario
Sportspeople from Ontario
Medalists at the 1908 Summer Olympics
20th-century Canadian people